Edward Neal Peters (born 1957) is an American Roman Catholic canonist and serves as a referendary of the Apostolic Signatura (an advisor/consultant to the Holy See's top tribunal). He is professor of canon law at the Sacred Heart Major Seminary of the Archdiocese of Detroit.

Early life and education
Peters was born in 1957 and raised in St. Louis, Missouri, where he attended the Chaminade College Preparatory School from 1970 to 1975. He attended Saint Louis University, majoring in political science, graduating in 1979. He earned his Juris Doctor degree from University of Missouri-Columbia School of Law in 1982, during the third year of which he was a teaching assistant in the Legal Research and Writing Program for Tate Hall. After graduation, Peters was admitted to the Missouri Bar Association.

Professional career
In 1988, Peters earned his Licentiate of Canon Law degree from the Catholic University of America School of Canon Law and was named Quasten Fellow for doctoral studies there, completing doctoral course work in 1990, and defending his doctoral dissertation, "Penal Procedural Law in the 1983 Code of Canon Law", in August 1991.

Over the next twelve years, Peters served as director of the Office for Canonical Affairs, vice-chancellor and chancellor, Defender of the Bond, and collegial judge for diocesan and appellate tribunals for the dioceses of Duluth and San Diego. From May 2001, Peters taught at the (Graduate) Institute for Pastoral Theology in Ann Arbor, Michigan. In 2005, he was appointed to the Cardinal Szoka Chair of Canon Law at Sacred Heart Major Seminary in Detroit. In 2010, he was named a referendary of the Supreme Tribunal of the Apostolic Signatura by Pope Benedict XVI, a consultant, becoming the first layman appointed to that post since the re-establishment of the Signatura early in the 20th century.

Works

1988: Home Schooling & the New Code of Canon Law (Brownson studies)
1997: 100 Answers to Your Questions on Annulments (a Basilica Press "Modern Apologetics" Book)
2000: Tabulae congruentiae inter Codicem iuris canonici et versiones anteriores canonum
2001: The 1917 or Pio-Benedictine Code of Canon Law: in English Translation with Extensive Scholarly Apparatus
2004: Annulments and the Catholic Church
2005: Incrementa in progressu 1983 Codicis iuris canonici
2006: Excommunication and the Catholic Church
2008: A Modern Guide to Indulgences

References

External links

SHMS.edu, "Dr. Edward Peters Biography"
CanonLaw.info (personal website), "Curriculum Vitae: Edward N. Peters, JD, JCD, Ref. Sig. Ap."
In the Light of the Law (personal blog)

1957 births
Living people
20th-century American non-fiction writers
21st-century American non-fiction writers
American bloggers
American male bloggers
American male non-fiction writers
American Roman Catholic religious writers
Canon law jurists
Catholic University of America alumni
Catholics from Missouri
Date of birth missing (living people)
Lawyers from St. Louis
Sacred Heart Major Seminary faculty
Saint Louis University alumni
University of Missouri alumni
Writers from St. Louis
Catholic University of America School of Canon Law alumni
Chaminade College Preparatory School (Missouri) alumni
20th-century American male writers